The women's regu sepak takraw competition at the 2014 Asian Games in Incheon was held from 29 September to 3 October at the Bucheon Gymnasium.

Squads

Results 
All times are Korea Standard Time (UTC+09:00)

Preliminary

Group A

|-
|29 September||09:00
|align=right|
|align=center|2–0
|align=left|
|21–16||21–19||
|-
|29 September||11:00
|align=right|
|align=center|0–2
|align=left|
|12–21||13–21||
|-
|30 September||09:00
|align=right|
|align=center|2–1
|align=left|
|13–21||21–12||21–19
|-
|30 September||11:00
|align=right|
|align=center|0–2
|align=left|
|16–21||14–21||
|-
|1 October||09:00
|align=right|
|align=center|2–0
|align=left|
|21–9||21–7||
|-
|1 October||11:00
|align=right|
|align=center|2–0
|align=left|
|21–14||21–18||
|-

Group B

|-
|29 September||14:00
|align=right|
|align=center|2–0
|align=left|
|21–10||21–9||
|-
|29 September||16:00
|align=right|
|align=center|1–2
|align=left|
|21–17||15–21||12–21
|-
|30 September||14:00
|align=right|
|align=center|2–0
|align=left|
|21–10||21–5||
|-
|30 September||16:00
|align=right|
|align=center|0–2
|align=left|
|6–21||9–21||
|-
|1 October||14:00
|align=right|
|align=center|2–0
|align=left|
|21–6||21–11||
|-
|1 October||14:00
|align=right|
|align=center|0–2
|align=left|
|17–21||14–21||
|-

Knockout round

Semifinals

|-
|2 October||14:00
|align=right|
|align=center|1–2
|align=left|
|21–19||12–21||13–21
|-
|2 October||16:00
|align=right|
|align=center|2–0
|align=left|
|21–19||21–11||
|-

Gold medal match

|-
|3 October||09:30
|align=right|
|align=center|0–2
|align=left|
|12–21||16–21||
|-

References

External links
 Official website

Sepak takraw at the 2014 Asian Games